This table displays the top-rated primetime television series of the 1959–60 season as measured by Nielsen Media Research.

References

1959 in American television
1960 in American television
1959-related lists
1960-related lists
Lists of American television series